Pralayollas (The Ecstasy of Destruction or  Destructive Euphoria), also known after its first line as Tora sab jayadbhani kar  is a popular revolutionary Bengali song set to Dadra Tala, whose lyrics and tune were written by national poet Kazi Nazrul Islam in 1921.  It was the first revolutionary Bengali poem collected in early 1922 in a volume titled Agnibeena: the first anthology of Nazrul's poems.

Lyrics

References

External links
Kabir Chowdhury's English translation of Pralayollas

Bengali-language poems
Poems written by Kazi Nazrul Islam
1921 poems